Martin Karlsson (born February 13, 1996) is a Swedish ice hockey player. He is currently playing with Färjestad BK of the Swedish Hockey League (SHL).

Karlsson made his Swedish Hockey League debut playing with Färjestad BK during the 2014–15 SHL season.

References

External links

1996 births
Färjestad BK players
Living people
Swedish ice hockey left wingers
People from Borås
Sportspeople from Västra Götaland County